Expressed love for the close of kin (Arabic: Mawaddat al-Qurba) is a Hadith collection purportedly written by the Sunni Shafii Jurist Mir Sayyid Ali Hamadani.

The book's name is based on the Qur'anic verse , a verse the according to many Muslims makes love to the Ahl al-Bayt obligatory.

The author, after having read the Qur'anic verse that demand Muslim to express love (mawaddat) for the Ahl al-Bayt (fi al-Qurba), started to collect narrations regarding them. At the end, it mounted up to a book.

This book is quoted in Yanabi al-Muwadda purportedly authorized by Sulayman al-Qunduzi and is a central source of guidance for the Qadiriyya wa Naqshbandiyya.

See also 
 Sayyid Abdul Qadir Gilani
 Mir Sayyid Ali Hamadani
 Ahl al-Bayt
 Qadiriyya wa Naqshbandiyya

References

External links
http://www.al-Islam.org/encyclopedia/chapter3/4.html

Hadith collections